George Conn was an American soccer player who spent twelve seasons with the Kearny Scots in the American Soccer League.  During those twelve seasons, the Scots won five league titles (1937, 1938, 1939, 1940 and 1941).  In 1939, he was part of an ASL All Star team which played the Scottish national team during its tour of North American.

References

External links
 West Hudson: A Cradle of American Soccer

American Soccer League (1933–1983) players
American soccer players
Kearny Scots players
Association footballers not categorized by position
Year of birth missing